Joyce Country is a cultural region in counties Galway and Mayo in Ireland. It is sometimes called Partry, after the former tribal territory of the Partraige, which it largely matches. Part of it falls within the Connacht Gaeltacht. Joyce Country lies on the shores of Lough Mask and Lough Corrib, and includes the Partry Mountains. It is a rural area that includes small settlements such as Clonbur, Cong, Cornamona and Toormakeady. It borders Connemara, to its south and west.

Joyce family
One of the first of the family ("Seoige" in Gaelic) recorded in Connacht was Thomas Joy, who established a minor Hiberno-Norman lordship in northern Iar Connacht. His territory was the barony of Ross, contiguous to Killery Bay and extending from Cong river to the river. The Joyce family became completely Gaelicised, ruled over their followers like the Chiefs of an Irish clan, and assimilated into the local Gaelic culture.

Statistics

See also
County Galway
Galway City Gaeltacht
Gaeltacht Cois Fharraige
Conamara Theas
Aran Islands
County Donegal
Gaoith Dhobhair
Na Rosa
Cloch Cheann Fhaola
Gaeltacht an Láir
County Kerry
Gaeltacht Corca Dhuibhne
County Mayo
Gaeltacht Iorrais agus Acaill
County Sligo
Referred to as Yeats Country

Books
 Hardiman, James, History of Galway, 1820
 Gillespie and Moran, eds., Galway: History and Society, Geography Publications, 1996. 
 Martyn, Adrian, The Tribes of Galway:1124–1642, Galway, 2016.

References

Geography of County Mayo
Geography of County Galway